Alaka Keshav Deshpande is an Indian medical doctor and social worker known for her work towards AIDS patients. She worked at JJ Hospital Mumbai and in 1990, started the first HIV OPD (Out Patient Department). She established and headed the Anti-Retroviral Therapy (ART) section from 2003-04 till 2011. She was noted to have not taken any salary for this tenure from the hospital. In 2001, she was presented with Padma Shri, India's 4th highest civilian honour.

References 

Indian health activists
Social workers
Indian women medical doctors
20th-century Indian medical doctors
Living people
Recipients of the Padma Shri in medicine
Medical doctors from Maharashtra
Year of birth missing (living people)
20th-century Indian women